Alena Mills  (born 9 June 1990) is a Czech ice hockey player and captain of the Czech national ice hockey team,  signed with Brynäs IF Dam of the Swedish Women's Hockey League (SDHL). She was part of the first Czech team that made their top-level IIHF World Women's Championship debut at the 2013 tournament as well as captain of the first Czech team to earn a medal at Women's Worlds in 2022.

Playing career
She won a bronze medal for the Czech Republic at the 2008 IIHF World Women's U18 Championship. In the bronze medal game, Mills scored two goals. At the 2008 Roller Hockey World Championships, she won a gold medal. It marked the first time that a European team had won the event. On August 12, 2010, she was named captain of the Czech Republic Olympic Development Team.

NCAA
Mills joined the Brown Bears in the autumn of 2009 and appeared in 28 games during her freshman campaign. Her five goals tied for first on the squad, and her 96 shots on goal led all Bears skaters. On January 31, 2010, versus Yale, she registered two assists. In an exhibition game versus the Etobicoke Dolphins on October 17, 2010, Mills scored two goals in a 5–2 victory.

Russia
Mills played in Russia from 2014 to 2022. Her first season was played in the Russian Women's Hockey League (RWHL) with Dinamo Saint Petersburg, and she then remained with the club as the RWHL was replaced by the Zhenskaya Hockey League for the 2015–16 season. After four seasons with Dinamo, she signed with Agidel Ufa in 2018. With Agidel, Mills won the 2019 Russian Championship and was selected for the ZhHL All-Star Game in 2019 and 2020. Following that season, she signed with the KRS Vanke Rays

International 
Mills has been a stalwart member of the Czech National team for nearly two decades. She has been captain since 2010 and led the team through promotion to the Top Division as well as their first medal win. She also served as flag bearer for the Czechs during the 2022 Winter Olympics.

Personal life 
Mills' Czech Republic jersey from the 2008 IIHF Women's U18 World Championship was displayed at the Hockey Hall of Fame in Toronto.

In June 2018, she married American ex-pat Thomas Mills, who she met while playing in Saint Petersburg. Thomas Mills grew up in Hoonah and Juneau, Alaska and, teaches in Russia while his wife is traveling playing hockey.

Career statistics

Regular season and playoffs

International

Sources:

Awards and honors
Most Valuable Player for the Czech Republic, 2008 U18 World Championship
Most Valuable Player, Princeton Tiger Lilies, 2009

References

External links
 
 

1990 births
Living people
Brown Bears women's ice hockey players
Czech expatriate ice hockey people
Czech expatriate ice hockey players in Finland
Czech expatriate ice hockey players in Russia
Czech expatriate ice hockey players in Sweden
Czech expatriate ice hockey players in the United States
Czech women's ice hockey forwards
HPK Kiekkonaiset players
Ice hockey players at the 2022 Winter Olympics
Olympic ice hockey players of the Czech Republic
People from Kutná Hora
Shenzhen KRS Vanke Rays players
Sportspeople from the Central Bohemian Region
Brynäs IF Dam players